The Lac de Creno is a small lake in the Monte Rotondo massif in the Corse-du-Sud department of France.

Location

It is in the Orto commune of Corse-du-Sud to the north of the  Monte Sant Eliseo.
It is drained by the Ruisseau de Creno, which flows south to join the Fiume Grosso, a tributary of the Liamone river.
It is a glacial lake, partially covered by water lilies and surrounded by a forest of laricio pines.

See also

List of waterbodies of Corse-du-Sud

Notes

Sources

Further reading

 
 

Lakes of Corsica